The Wrath Of The Seas is an 1886 painting by Russian artist Ivan Aivazovsky. Oil on canvas, it measures 70.1 × 110 cm, and is held in a private collection.

Description 
The painting portrays a storm sea near the rocks vanishing in the gloom. The raging sea merges with the stormy sky. The lightning strikes from behind heavy clouds. The waves splash against the high coast and flow down the rocks. The atmosphere of the storm and wrath of the sea is depicted with such power that the spectator can almost hear the crashing waves and the rolling thunder.

On the left side of the foreground, you can see a boat with people trying to survive a shipwreck. One of them is pointing his hand towards the coast, the others are rowing, and the will to survive gives hope for the rescue of those who refused to succumb to the disaster.

The dark colours prevail in the painting. Yet, there is a significant contrast between the impenetrable heavy clouds and their light-toned edges penetrated by moonshine. It is based on a combination of cold and warm grey, navy blue, and yellowish ochre tones.

A fairly philosophical nature of the painting typical for the best pieces of art, the sky and the sea merging into one, and the flashes of scarlet lightning on the water are reminiscent of the works by British painter William Turner, yet another great master of romanticist marine art.

Fyodor Dostoevsky about Aivazovsky's Storm over Yevpatoria: “His storm has a thrill, a perpetual beauty that strikes the spectator as he is thinking of a live real storm” and more: "when portraying the endless diversity of the storm, nothing can appear exaggerated". These words are totally true for The Wrath Of The Seas as well, despite the fact that it was created 25 years after Fyodor Dostoevsky's article was published (1861).

The painting has two signatures of the author, which is quite common for Ivan Aivazovsky. One of them is on the front next to the lower right corner and is made in black paint: “Aivazovsky 1886”. The paint of the signature has the same crack patterns as the underlayer. The second author's signature is on the back of the painting at its upper right and is made with brown paint: “Aivazovsky”.

The work is in excellent shape.

Peculiarities of painterly manner 

As he was creating the painting, the artist used a complex painting technique, including a preliminary drawing with an undercoat graphite pencil, a few paint coats of various textures and directions, scumble, and overtone, strokes of various shape, thickness, and length, and diverse textured compactions.

The painting was made in several stages. The principal outline is made in large strokes of medium thickness. Then finer details are portrayed over the layer slightly touched by fading. The bright cloud edges are painted with bristly brushes in short strokes that depict their round shapes perfectly. The concluding outlines (webby sections of the foam dissolving in the waves, water flowing from the rocks, etc.) are painted in translucent bleach scumbles. The foam of the waves is depicted with fine floating zigzags that oftentimes thicken into diverse bunches (on brighter surfaces). The human figures in gliding blue, emerald green, red, and ochre strokes are portrayed in a generalised manner depicting a common zeal for survival.

Technology 

The work is made on a thin rare medium-grained canvas with a light factory undercoat and is put on a key stretcher. The painter equally used this type of canvas for many other works.

The painting microsampling by means of infrared spectroscopy, microchemical, emission, phosphorescent and thermochemical types of analysis established that the colour combination of the painting is most typical for Ivan Aivazovsky's works. The piece bears no marks of the paints that were not used or were rarely used by the painter

Provenance 

Painting from a well-known princely collection, Germany. In 2007, the owner who purchased the painting back in the 1940s from the private collection mentioned above put it under the Sotheby's hammer in London.

It was exposed at the exhibition of Russian fine art masterpieces in the State Historical Museum of Russia that opened on 8 November 2007

The experts characterised the painting as an outstanding masterpiece referred to as among the best lots in the auction. Specifically, Joanna Vickery, director of the Russian section at Sotheby's, said: "The Wrath Of The Seas deserves special attention: the painter did a great job depicting the outrage of nature with so much emotion and expression".

At the Russian evening sale of Sotheby's London division held for the first time in history on 26 November 2007  The Wrath Of The Seas (Lot No. 12) was sold for £513,300, which is equivalent to over $1,000,000 (net of the auction and other fees).

Currently, the painting is kept in a private collection.

References 

Paintings by Ivan Aivazovsky
Maritime paintings
1886 paintings